The Ensoniq ES-5506 "OTTO" is a chip used in implementations of sample-based synthesis. Musical instruments and IBM PC compatible sound cards were the most popular applications.

OTTO is capable of altering the pitch and timbre of a digital recording, and is capable of operating with up to 32 channels at once. Each channel can have several parameters altered, such as pitch, volume, waveform, and filtering. The chip is a VLSI device designed to be manufactured on a 1.5 micrometre double-metal CMOS process. It consists of approximately 80,000 transistors. It was part of the fourth generation of Ensoniq audio technology.

Major features

Real time digital filters
Frequency interpolation
32 independent voices
Loop start and stop positions for each voice (bidirectional and reverse looping)
Motorola 68000 compatibility for asynchronous bus communication
Separate host and sound memory interface
At least 18-bit accuracy
6 channel stereo serial communication port
Programmable clocks for defining serial protocol
Internal volume multiplication and stereo panning
ADC input for pots and wheels
Hardware support for envelopes
Support for dual OTTO systems
Optional compressed data format for sample data
Up to 16 MHz operation

Implementations
Taito Cybercore/F3 System
Seta SSV System
Ensoniq TS10/TS12 Synthesizers
Ensoniq Soundscape S-2000
Ensoniq Soundscape Elite
Ensoniq SoundscapeDB daughterboard
Gravis Ultrasound Gravis GF1 chip (Ensoniq based)
Westacott Organs DRE (Digital Rank Emulator)
Boom Theory Corp 0.0 Drum Module Interface

References

Sound chips
Sound cards